is a Japanese former baseball player for the Hokkaido Nippon-Ham Fighters of Nippon Professional Baseball. He played for the Fighters during all 22 years of his professional career, earning the nickname "Mr. Fighters".

Tanaka played for Japan's national team in the 2000 Summer Olympics. On May 15, 2007, he recorded his 2,000th career hit during a game against Tohoku Rakuten Golden Eagles, automatically becoming a member of Meikyukai (the Golden Players Club). For most of his career, Tanaka wore uniform number 6. Tanaka retired in 2007. As a coach, he wears #72.

The minor planet 20019 Yukiotanaka is named after Tanaka.

References

External links

1967 births
Living people
Baseball people from Miyazaki Prefecture
Nippon Ham Fighters players
Hokkaido Nippon-Ham Fighters players
Olympic baseball players of Japan
Baseball players at the 2000 Summer Olympics
Japanese baseball coaches
Nippon Professional Baseball coaches